Landmark court decisions in India substantially change the interpretation of existing law. Such a landmark decision may settle the law in more than one way. In present-day common law legal systems it may do so by:
 Establishing a significant new legal principle or concept;
 Overturning prior precedent based on its negative effects or flaws in its reasoning;
 Distinguishing a new principle that refines a prior principle, thus departing from prior practice without violating the rule of stare decisis;
 Establishing a "test" (that is, a measurable standard that can be applied by courts in future decisions).

In India, landmark court decisions come most frequently from the Supreme Court of India, which is the highest judicial body in India. High courts of India may also make such decisions, particularly if the Supreme Court chooses not to review the case or if it adopts the holding of the lower court.

Individual rights

Criminal law

Constitutional jurisprudence
The Supreme Court of India, which is the highest judicial body in India, has decided many leading cases of Constitutional jurisprudence, establishing Constitution Benches for hearing the same. Given below are a list of some leading cases.

Polity and Administration

Established new tests and regulations

See also
 Judiciary of India

Reference

Indian case law
Supreme Court of India cases
Judiciary of India